Mummy brown, also called Egyptian brown, is a rich brown bituminous pigment, intermediate in tint between burnt umber and raw umber, and was one of the favourite colours of the Pre-Raphaelites.

History
Mummy brown was originally made in the 16th and 17th centuries from white pitch, myrrh, and the ground-up remains of ancient Egyptian mummies (both human and feline), but also Guanche mummies of Canary Islands. As it had good transparency, it could be used for glazes, shadows, flesh tones and shading. However, in addition to its tendency to crack, it was extremely variable in its composition and quality, and since it contained ammonia and particles of fat, was likely to affect other colours with which it was used. 

Historically, demand for mummy brown sometimes outstripped the available supply of true Egyptian mummies, leading to occasional substitution of contemporary corpses of slaves or criminals. In 1564, a mummy seller in Alexandria displayed forty specimens he claimed to have manufactured himself. 

Mummy brown began to fall from popularity during the late 19th century when its composition became more generally known to artists. The Pre-Raphaelite artist Edward Burne-Jones was reported to have ceremonially buried his tube of mummy brown in his garden when he discovered its true origins. By 1915, demand for mummy brown had slowed so much that one London colourman claimed that he could satisfy the demands of his customers for twenty years from one Egyptian mummy. By the start of the 20th century, mummy brown had largely ceased production in its traditional form, owing to a continued decline in the supply of available mummies as well as a significant drop in demand.

Present day
The modern pigment sold as "mummy brown" is composed of a mixture of kaolin, quartz, goethite, and hematite, with the hematite and goethite (generally 60% of the content) determining the colour – the more hematite the redder the pigment – and the others being inert substances that can vary the opacity or tinting strength. The colour of mummy brown can vary from yellow to red to dark violet, the latter usually called "mummy violet".

See also
 Caput mortuum (pigment), a pigment also known as cardinal purple
 Mummia, a medicinal preparation sometimes made from mummies

Notes

References

Iron oxide pigments
Pigments
Shades of brown
Mummies